The 1940 National Division was the 4th edition of the Turkish National Division. Fenerbahçe won their second title.

Participating clubs
Beşiktaş - Istanbul Football League, 1st
Fenerbahçe - Istanbul Football League, 2nd
Galatasaray - Istanbul Football League, 3rd
Vefa - Istanbul Football League, 4th
Gençlerbirliği - Ankara Football League, 1st
Muhafızgücü - Ankara Football League, 2nd
Altınordu - İzmir Football League, 1st
Altay - İzmir Football League, 2nd

League table

Results

References
 Erdoğan Arıpınar; Tevfik Ünsi Artun, Cem Atabeyoğlu, Nurhan Aydın, Ergun Hiçyılmaz, Haluk San, Orhan Vedat Sevinçli, Vala Somalı (June 1992). Türk Futbol Tarihi (1904-1991) vol.1, Page(81), Türkiye Futbol Federasyonu Yayınları.

Turkish National Division Championship seasons
1939–40 in Turkish football
Turkey